Jason Dungjen (born September 28, 1967) is an American figure skating coach and a former pair skater. With Kyoko Ina, he is a two-time Skate America silver medalist, a three-time Nations Cup medalist, and a two-time U.S. national champion. With Susan Dungjen, he is the 1983 NHK Trophy silver medalist and 1984 World Junior silver medalist.

Career 
Dungjen's first skating partner was his sister, Susan Dungjen. Together, they won silver medals at the 1983 NHK Trophy, 1984 World Junior Championships, and 1984 Grand Prix International St. Gervais. After their partnership ended, he competed with Paula Visingardi and Karen Courtland.

Dungjen began competing with Kyoko Ina in the 1991–92 season. They won the 1997 and 1998 U.S. Championships and placed fourth at the 1998 Winter Olympics. They withdrew from the 1998 World Championships after an accident during a practice session — while practicing a triple twist, Ina's arm hit Dungjen's forehead, fracturing the browbone above his right eye. Their partnership dissolved after the event and he retired from competition. Dungjen later skated with then-wife Yuka Sato on the Stars on Ice tour.

Dungjen is a coach at the Detroit Skating Club in Bloomfield Hills, Michigan and an ISU Technical Specialist for the United States. Among others, he has coached Alissa Czisny, Jeremy Abbott, Valentina Marchei, and Adam Rippon.

Personal life 
Dungjen is now married to Clara Rua.

Programs 
(with Ina)

Competitive highlights

With Kyoko Ina

With Karen Courtland

With Paula Visingardi

With Susan Dungjen

References

External links

 Stars on Ice Profile

Navigation

Living people
American male pair skaters
Figure skaters at the 1998 Winter Olympics
Figure skaters at the 1994 Winter Olympics
Olympic figure skaters of the United States
International Skating Union technical specialists
1967 births
World Junior Figure Skating Championships medalists
Sportspeople from Detroit
Figure skaters from Detroit